Bijan Mortazavi (born November 16, 1957) is an Iranian virtuoso violinist, musician, composer, songwriter, arranger and singer.

Biography

Musical education
Born in the city of Babol, Iran. Mortazavi studied music in Tehran. He was trained in improvisation, orchestration, arrangement, quarter tone technique, and dastgah by various well-known violinists in Iran.

Mortazavi started learning the violin under the supervision of Masoud Namazian when he was three years old. In a Nowruz 1991 interview with Alireza Amirghassemi on The Tapesh Show, Mortazavi claimed that as part of his tutelage, Namazian had him focus for the first three months only on music theory to learn the notes and scales and then apply them to the violin, as Mortazavi did not attend music school, and advised his parents to not let him touch the violin during that time. Mortazavi claimed his mother hid his violin in a cupboard for that period, although he would often play on the violin in secret until his mother eventually caught him. He would later take lessons from Ali Tajvidi, Parviz Yahaghi, Habibollah Badiei, Jahangir Kamiyan, Hasan Shamaizadeh.

At the age of seven, he also started playing the piano, guitar, percussion, and folk string instruments such as oud, tar, and santur.

Mortazavi won his first prize at the age of eleven in a national music contest among students of all ages in Iran. He was fourteen when he conducted a 32-person orchestra, performing his own compositions and arrangements at the Ramsar Summer Camp in Iran.

After graduating from high school, Mortazavi moved to the United Kingdom. There, he pursued his academic interest in the field of civil engineering while continuing to train and perform on the violin.

Professional career 
In 1979, Mortazavi moved to the United States, continued his music and engineering education at Texas State University, and eventually settled in California in 1985. There he started composing and arranging music for Iranian pop singers, and playing the violin in the background for singers such as Moein, Hayedeh and Sattar. He released his first album, Bijan Mortazavi: Magic of His Music and His Songs, in 1990, and it became a best-seller among Persian albums that year. Mortazavi was interviewed on The Tapesh Show by Alireza Amirghassemi for the 1991 Persian New Year, at the end of which he performed the album's first song, "Asheghi Chieh", along with "Gole Sangam", on the piano, singing along with Sattar, Shahrum K and the show's presenters, to close the final Nowrooz episode.

After the release of his album Bijan Mortazavi 3, which featured Mortazavi's talents as a violinist and singer, his next album, Fire on Ice (Instrumental), was a combination of Persian-style violin and new-age instrumental music. He released two more albums, Sweet Scent of Love and Voice of Silence, in 1999 and 2001, respectively.

In 2004 Bijan released the album Ye Ghatreh Darya, an upbeat dance album that included a Kordish style dance-music, rhythm and circle-dance track titled "Ronak". The album has been played at many Persian weddings and parties.

His 2006 album, Be Man Che, featured lyrics written by the Iranian poet Iraj Janatie Ataie, who has written lyrics for Iranian pop singers such as Ebi and Dariush. Ataie himself declaimed the poetic lyrics at the beginning of the title track.

Since the album Fire on Ice, Mortazavi's albums have been a combination of instrumental and vocal pieces. What sets him apart from other performers is his ability to personally play all the instruments used in his arrangements.

On November 25, 2009, Bijan received his Fellowship (PhD) from Southampton Solent University in Great Britain, in recognition of his work on the development of contemporary middle eastern music in an academic form in United Kingdom and other western countries.

On November 16, 2010, his latest album (Music and I) was released.

On July 12, 2017, Southampton Solent University awarded him the honorary degree of Doctor of Music.

Instrument 
Mortazavi always uses a white, handmade violin in his performances. "I like to play my white violin because to me white represents peace and friendship", Mortazavi said in a TV interview.

Concerts 
Since 1990, international tours have brought Mortazavi to sold-out audiences throughout the world.
In 1995 he was the first Iranian artist to be sponsored by the Chrysler Corporation.

Greek Theatre and other venues 
On July 3, 1994, Bijan Mortazavi performed his music with an orchestra at the Greek Theatre in Los Angeles, becoming the first Iranian musician to be featured at the theatre. One of the pieces he played during this concert, entitled "Epic", had been written by him when he was eleven years old. A video of the concert has been released as Bijan Live at the Greek Theatre.

Bijan has performed in other big venues around the world, among them the Shrine Auditorium in Los Angeles, the Gibson Amphitheater (aka Universal Amphitheater) in Universal City, California, the Kodak Theatre in Hollywood and Highland Center, the Royal Albert Hall, Equinox and Le Palace in London, the Ford Center, Performing Arts Center, Roy Thomson Hall in Toronto, Queen Elizabeth Auditorium in Vancouver, the Albert Hall in Copenhagen, the Nobel Concert Hall and Global Auditorium in Stockholm, and the Performing arts center and Civic Auditoriums in Australia's Sydney, Perth, Melbourne, Brisbane, Adelaide and Auckland in New Zealand.

Discography

Studio albums
 1990 – Bijan Mortazavi: The Magic of His Music and His Songs (Bijan Mortazavi 1)
 1992 – Bijan Mortazavi 2
 1994 – Bijan Mortazavi 3 (instrumental album)
 1994 – Bijan Mortazavi 3 (vocal album)
 1997 – Fire on Ice (instrumental album)
 1997 – Fire on Ice (vocal album)
 1999 – Sweet Scent of Love
 2001 – Voice of Silence
 2004 – Yeh Ghatreh Darya
 2006 – Beh Man Cheh
 2010 – Music and I

Live albums 
 1994 – Bijan Live at the Greek Theatre

Music videos 
1994 – Bijan Live at the Greek Theatre
2003 – "Ye Ghatreh Darya" from the album Ye Ghatreh Darya
2003–  "Gerye Konam Ya Nakonam" from the album Ye Ghatreh Darya
2003 – "Ronak" from the album Ye Ghatreh Darya
2003 – "Lavand" from the album Ye Ghatreh Darya
2003 – "Rainbow" from the album Ye Ghatreh Darya
2004 – Bijan in Concert
2005 – "Be man Che" from the album Be man Che
2005 – "Ey Maah" from the album Be man Che
2005 – "Kaash Mishod" from the album Be man Che
2005 – "ma ro daste kam nagir" from the album Be man Che
2010 – "Axe To" from the album Music and I
2010 – "Man o Toe" from the album Music and I
2010 – "Noor o Booseh" from the album Music and I
2010 – "Da'vat" from the album Music and I
2011 – Animated video of "Moosighi o Man" from the album Music and I
2014 – "Asheghtaram Kardi" music video as a single
2015 – "Ayriliq" video with Ukraine Symphonic Orchestra, as a single
2016 – "Ashegh naboodi" music video as a single
2016 – "Azizam" music video as a single
2016 – "Eshveh" from the album Bijan 2
2017 – "Kaash" music video as a single
2017 – "Gelayeh" music video as a single

See also 
 Iraj Janatie Ataie
 List of Iranian musicians
 List of Persian violinists
 Moein
 Music of Iran
 Persian pop music
 Shadmehr Aghili
 Pouya Jalili Pour

References

External links 
 Bijan Mortazavi's upcoming and past concerts
 [ Bijan Mortazavi] at Allmusic
 
 Bijan on Tapesh TV

1957 births
Living people
Iranian emigrants to the United States
20th-century Iranian musicians
Iranian pop singers
Iranian singer-songwriters
Iranian violinists
Iranian emigrants to the United Kingdom
People from Babol
21st-century violinists
Caltex Records artists
Taraneh Records artists